The 2018 Lamar Hunt U.S. Open Cup Final was played on September 26, 2018, at BBVA Compass Stadium in Houston, Texas. The match determined the winner of the 2018 U.S. Open Cup, a tournament open to amateur and professional soccer teams affiliated with the United States Soccer Federation. It was the 105th edition of the oldest competition in United States soccer. This edition of the final was contested between Houston Dynamo and the Philadelphia Union, both of Major League Soccer.

The match was broadcast in English on ESPN2 and in Spanish on Univision Deportes, making it the fourth straight time the cup final was aired on one of the ESPN networks.

Houston Dynamo won the match 3–0 for their first U.S. Open Cup title.

Match

Details

References

 

2018 U.S. Open Cup
U.S. Open Cup Finals
U.S. Open Cup Final 2018
U.S. Open Cup Final 2018